MOA-2008-BLG-310Lb is an extrasolar planet which orbits probably the late K-type star MOA-2008-BLG-310L, located at least 20000 light years away in the constellation Scorpius. This planet has mass 23% of Jupiter or 77% of Saturn and orbits at 1.25 AU from the star. This planet was discovered by using the gravitational microlensing method on August 4, 2009. As it is typical for exoplanets detected by microlensing method, the orbital period and eccentricity are not determined.

See also 
 MOA-2007-BLG-192Lb
 OGLE-2005-BLG-390Lb

References 

 web preprint

Exoplanets discovered in 2009
Giant planets
Exoplanets detected by microlensing
Scorpius (constellation)